Bayat District is a district of the Çorum Province of Turkey. Its seat is the town of Bayat. Its area is 717 km2, and its population is 14,615 (2022).

Composition
There is one municipality in Bayat District:
 Bayat

There are 40 villages in Bayat District:

 Ahacık
 Akseki
 Aşağı Emirhalil
 Ayvalıca
 Barak
 Bayan
 Beydili
 Çamlıgüney
 Çayköy
 Çerkeş
 Cevizli
 Çukuröz
 Demirciler
 Derekutuğun
 Dorukseki
 Emirhalil
 Emirşah
 Eskialibey
 Evci
 Falı
 Hacıbayram
 İleği
 İshaklı
 Kalınpelit
 Karakaya
 Köpüklü
 Kubbedin
 Kunduzlu
 Kuruçay
 Lapa
 Pancarlık
 Sağpazar
 Sarayköy
 Tepekutuğun
 Tevekli
 Toyhane
 Yeniköy
 Yenişıhlar
 Yeşilçat
 Yoncalı

References

Districts of Çorum Province